The giant nukupuu (Hemignathus vorpalis) is an extinct species of finch in the family Fringillidae, which is only known from fossil remains. It was endemic to Hawaii. Its extinction is believed to have occurred within the last 3000 years, but exact timing and reasons remain unclear. It was larger and had a different bill morphology than the remaining members of the genus Hemignathus.

References
 James, Helen F., & Olson, Storrs L. (2003). A giant new species of nukupuu (Fringillidae: Drepanidini: Hemignathus) from the island of Hawaii. The Auk. 120(4): 970–981.

Hemignathus
Hawaiian honeycreepers
Extinct birds of Hawaii
Endemic fauna of Hawaii
Holocene extinctions
Birds described in 2003
Taxa named by Helen F. James